Mary Jenkins may refer to:

 Mary Hurley Jenkins, character on the situation comedy, 227
 Mary Jenkins (conspirator) (1823–1865), convicted of taking part in the conspiracy to assassinate Abraham Lincoln
Mary Jenkins (writer) (born 1944), Welsh-Canadian historical romance novelist

See also 
 Jenkins (surname)